Alain Payet (17 January 1947 – 13 December 2007 in Paris as a result of cancer), also known under the pseudonyms John Pardaillan, John and Frederick Brasil Amor, James Gardner, James Gartner and Alain Garnier, was a film director of French pornographic movies and erotica.

Biography
Payet began his career in the 1970s, and, for a decade, he served as an assistant director on shoots for Philippe Labro and Claude Vidal. In 1973 and 1974, he oversaw the staging of pornographic comedies produced by Lucien Hustaix, such as Gambling Dens (Les Tripoteuses) or The Pleasures (Les Jouisseuses), before launching himself into the profession with the pseudonym of "John Love".

Not shying from extreme or deviant sexual practices and amateur actors, Alain Payet cast a 287-pound actress, nicknamed Groseille (Currant), in the movie Sexplosion makes black, and he cast the dwarf Desire Bastareaud as the lead actor in films like Les Gourmandes du sexe (The Gourmet sex) and Les Aventures érotiques de Lili pute (The Erotic Adventures of a Little Whore Lili) . In 1985, he launched the fashion of "Hard-Crad" with the film La Doctoresse a de gros seins (The doctor has big tits), which remains one of the best selling erotic video of the 1980s in France.

In the course of his career, Payet cast in his films many notable French porn actresses, such as Élodie Cherie, Karen Lancaume, Laure Sainclair, Katsuni, Ovidie or Tabatha Cash.

In the mainstream film industry, he directed several low-budget exploitation films and B-movies, such as L'Émir préfère les blondes (The Emir prefer blondes), with Paul Préboist or, for Eurociné production company, Train spécial pour Hitler (Hitler's Last Train) and Helga, la louve de Stilberg (Helga, She Wolf of Stilberg). His favorite maxim was: "Those who do not masturbate to porn movies are sick".

Selected filmography

Awards and nominations
Hot D'Or Awards:
 1999 winner - Best European Director (Le Labyrinthe)
 2000 winner - Best Remake or Adaptation (Les Tontons Tringleurs - Blue One)

Venus Awards:
 2003 winner - Best Director (France)

FICEB Awards:
 2000 Ninfa Award winner - Best Director (La fete a Gigi - International Film Grup)
 2002 Ninfa Award winner - Best Director (Public)

Footnotes

External links

 
 
 Director Alain Payet at the Adult Film Database

French film directors
1947 births
2007 deaths
French people in the sex industry
French pornographic film directors